DeGol Field is a  multi-purpose stadium in Loretto, Pennsylvania, with a seating capacity of 3,450. It is home to the Saint Francis University Red Flash football, field hockey, lacrosse and track and field teams.  The facility opened in 2006. It replaced the Pine Bowl that was built in 1979.

See also
 List of NCAA Division I FCS football stadiums

References

External links
 http://www.sfuathletics.com/sports/2010/11/3/GEN_1103101549.aspx?

College football venues
College field hockey venues in the United States
Saint Francis Red Flash football
Sports venues in Pennsylvania
Multi-purpose stadiums in the United States
Sports venues completed in 2006
2006 establishments in Pennsylvania
Buildings and structures in Cambria County, Pennsylvania